The Strahlhorn (3,027 m) is a mountain of the Bernese Alps, overlooking the Aletsch Glacier in the canton of Valais. It lies at the southern end of the Gross Wannenhorn range, just north of the Märjelensee.

References

External links
 Strahlhorn on Hikr

Mountains of the Alps
Alpine three-thousanders
Mountains of Switzerland
Mountains of Valais